The 1981 Montreal Alouettes finished the season in 3rd place in the East Division with a 3–13 record. They appeared in the East Semi-Final, where they lost to the Ottawa Rough Riders 20-16. After the season the Alouettes folded after owner Nelson Skalbania lost $2 million, and the CFL revoked the franchise from him with the team now heavily in debt.

Offseason
The Alouettes were purchased by Nelson Skalbania. Skalbania proceeded by signing several American stars. His biggest acquisition was Los Angeles Rams quarterback Vince Ferragamo (who appeared in Super Bowl XIV) to a $300,000 contract. The other signings included wide receiver James Scott, kick return specialist Billy "White Shoes" Johnson, running back David Overstreet and defensive end Keith Gary.

Preseason

Regular season
Despite the high-profile talent, the Alouettes finished the season with only 3 wins, but because of how weak the East Division was that year, the team did earn a playoff berth (the crossover rule, which allows a fourth place team with a better record than a third place team in the other division to qualify, had not yet been implemented). Skalbania lost two million dollars and the CFL revoked his ownership.

Standings

Schedule

Postseason

Awards and honours

References

External links
Official Site

Montreal Alouettes seasons
1981 Canadian Football League season by team
1980s in Montreal
1981 in Quebec